Girls and Boys is the second studio album from American pop singer Ingrid Michaelson. It was self-released on May 16, 2006. Some of the album's songs have been featured in the television series Grey's Anatomy. Michaelson's record label Cabin 24 Records re-released the album on September 18, 2007 and it peaked at No. 62 on the Billboard 200.

According to Nielsen SoundScan the album has sold 278,000 copies in the United States as of August 2009.

The  and other versions of the hit "The Way I Am" from the album have received over 10 million views.

Track listing
All songs written by Ingrid Michaelson.
"Die Alone" – 4:21
"Masochist" – 4:11
"Breakable" – 3:09
"The Hat" – 3:45
"The Way I Am" – 2:15
"Overboard" – 4:06
"Glass" – 3:04
"Starting Now" – 4:52
"Corner of Your Heart" – 3:07
"December Baby" – 5:53
"Highway" – 3:50
"Far Away" – 3:03 (hidden track)

Special Be OK edition
A special edition of the album was released in 2009 in Germany and Austria, additionally featuring all studio tracks from Be OK.

All songs written by Ingrid Michaelson, except where noted.
"Die Alone" – 4:21
"Masochist" – 4:11
"Breakable" – 3:09
"The Hat" – 3:45
"The Way I Am" – 2:15
"Overboard" – 4:06
"Glass" – 3:04
"Starting Now" – 4:52
"Corner of Your Heart" – 3:07
"December Baby" – 5:53
"Highway" – 3:50
"Far Away" – 3:03
"Keep Breathing" – 3:25
"Be OK" – 2:27
"Giving Up" – 4:09
"Over the Rainbow" (Harold Arlen, E.Y. Harburg) – 2:56
"Lady in Spain" – 3:11
 "Oh What a Day" – 2:28
 "You and I" – 2:28

Personnel
 Drew Fuccillo – organ, piano
 Lana Hagai – guitar, organ, vocals
 Elliot Jacobson – drums
 Chris Kuffner – producer, bass, guitar, vocals
 Ingrid Michaelson – guitar, piano, vocals, 
 Dan Romer – mixer, glockenspiel, keyboards
Greg Samothrakis - guitar, organ, vocals
 Mark Turrigiano – producer, guitar, keyboards, percussion, programming
 Roman Zeitlin – guitar

Chart positions

References

2006 albums
Ingrid Michaelson albums
Self-released albums